Viktoriya Tomova was the defending champion, having won the previous edition in 2019, however she chose to compete in Budapest instead.

Francesca Jones won the title, defeating Oksana Selekhmeteva in the final, 6–4, 7–6(7–4).

Seeds

Draw

Finals

Top half

Bottom half

References

Main Draw

Engie Open de Biarritz - Singles